Advanced Placement (AP) Chemistry (also known as AP Chem) is a course and examination offered by the College Board as a part of the Advanced Placement Program to give American and Canadian high school students the opportunity to demonstrate their abilities and earn college-level credit. AP Chemistry has the lowest test participation rate, with around half of AP Chemistry students taking the exam.

Course
AP Chemistry is a course geared toward students with interests in chemical biologies, as well as any of the biological sciences. The course aims to prepare students to take the AP Chemistry exam toward the end of the academic year.

AP Chemistry covers most introductory general chemistry topics (excluding organic chemistry), including:
 Reactions
 Chemical equilibrium
 Chemical kinetics
 Stoichiometry
 Thermodynamics
 Electrochemistry
 Reaction types
 States of matter
 Gases, Ideal gases and Kinetic theory
 Liquids
 Solids
 Solutions
 Structure of matter
 Atomic theory, including evidence for atomic theory
 Chemical bonding, including intermolecular forces (IMF)
 Nuclear chemistry (removed for May 2014 test)
 Molecular geometry
 Molecular models
 Mass spectrometry
Laboratory and chemical calculations
 Thermochemistry
 Chemical kinetics
 Chemical equilibrium
 Gas laws calculations

Exam Weighting

Exam

The annual AP Chemistry examination, which is typically administered in May, is divided into two major sections (multiple-choice questions and free response essays).

Old test (2013 and earlier) 

The old test was composed of two sections: a multiple-choice section consisting of 75 questions with five answer choices each, and a free-response section consisting of six essay prompts that required the authoring of chemical equations, solution of problems, and development of thoughtful essays in response to hypothetical scenarios.

 Section I, the multiple-choice portion, did not allow the use of a calculator, nor did it provide any additional reference material, other than a periodic table. Each question contained five answer choices. 90 minutes were allotted for the completion of Section I. Section I covered the breadth of the curriculum.
 Section II, the free response section, was divided into two sections: Part A, requiring the completion of three problems, and Part B, also containing three problems.  Part A, lasting 55 minutes, allowed the use of calculators, while Part B, lasting 40 minutes, did not. The first problem in Part A concerned equilibrium related to solubility, acids and bases, or pressure/concentration.  The first question of Part B was a chemical equation question in which 3 scenarios were presented and the student was required to work all 3 scenarios, authoring a balanced net ionic chemical equation for each scenario and answering questions about the equations and scenarios. If time permitted, students may have edited their responses from Part A during the time allotted for responding to Part B, though without the use of a calculator. The student needed to have completed all six questions.

While the use of calculators was prohibited during Section I and Section II Part B, a periodic table, a list of selected standard reduction potentials, and two pages of equations and conventions are available for use during the entirety of Section II.

New test (2014 and later) 

The 2014 AP Chemistry exam was the first administration of a redesigned test as a result of a redesigning of the AP Chemistry course.  The exam format is now different from the previous years, with 60 multiple choice questions (now with only four answer choices per question), 3 long free response questions, and 4 short free response questions. The new exam has a focus on longer, more in depth, lab-based questions. The penalty for incorrect answers on the multiple choice section was also removed.  More detailed information can be found at the related link.

Topics 

Structure and Matter, 20%
 States of Matter, 20%
 Reactions, 35–40%
 Descriptive Chemistry, 10–15%
 Laboratory, 5–10%

Grade distribution
The score distributions since 2007 were:

Prerequisites
The College Board recommends successful completion of high school chemistry and algebra 2; however, requirement of this may differ from school to school. AP Chemistry usually requires knowledge of algebra 2; however, some schools allow students to take the course concurrently with this class. The requirement of regular or honors level high school chemistry may also be waived, but usually requires completion of a special assignment or exam, or completion of high school chemistry alongside AP Chemistry.

See also 
Chemistry
Glossary of chemistry terms

References

External links

Test format change in 2007
AP Chemistry Exam Overview

Chemistry education
Advanced Placement
Standardized tests